Leccinum violaceotinctum is a species of bolete fungus in the family Boletaceae. Found in Belize under Pinus caribaea and Quercus spp, it was described  as new to science in 2007.

See also
List of Leccinum species

References

violaceotinctum
Fungi described in 2007
Fungi of Central America